Bellano is a comune (municipality) and small town on the eastern shore of Lake Como in the Province of Lecco in the Italian region Lombardy, located at northern outlet of the Valsassina.

The town's main attraction is the Orrido ("gorge" or small canyon) which was formed through erosion by the river Pioverna. The erosion started 15 million years ago. The church in the city is called Santi Nazario e Celso (built in 1348) and is in  the Gothic style.

Bellano is the location of most of the novels by local writer Andrea Vitali and the birthplace of the 17th-century writer and poet Sigismondo Boldoni.

References

External links
 
 Bellano - LarioOrientale.eu

Cities and towns in Lombardy
Valsassina